The ETAP 30i is a Belgian sailboat that was designed by French designers Mortain & Mavrikios, as a cruiser and first built in 1995.

Production
The design was built by ETAP Yachting in Belgium from 1995 to 2005 with 280 boats completed, but it is now out of production.

Design
The ETAP 30i is a recreational keelboat, built predominantly of polyester glassfibre-foam cored sandwich, with wood trim. It has a 7/8 fractional sloop rig with aluminum spars, a deck-stepped mast, wire standing rigging and a single set of swept spreaders. The hull has a raked stem, a walk-through reverse transom, an internally mounted spade-type rudder controlled by a tiller and a fixed fin, weighted bulb keel. It displaces  and carries  of cast iron ballast.

The foam-cored construction renders the boat unsinkable.

The fuel tank holds .

The design has sleeping accommodation for six people, with a double "V"-berth in the bow cabin, two straight settee quarter berths in the main cabin and an aft cabin with a double berth on the port side. The galley is located on the port side just forward of the companionway ladder. The galley is "L"-shaped and is equipped with a two-burner stove, a  ice box and a sink. The head is located opposite the galley, on the starboard side and includes a hanging locker.

Operational history
The boat was at one time supported by a class club, the ETAP Owners Association.

In a 2009 Yachting Monthly review stated, "the boat is stiff and sea-kindly under sail, well-suited to short-handed or family cruising, but the standard rig, which features a non-overlapping, self-tacking headsail, leaves her decidedly undercanvassed in light to moderate winds. The bright, cosy saloon – spacious for a 30-footer – has plentiful stowage in lockers along the gunwales, a centrally mounted dining table, a good-sized chart table with plenty of room for instruments, and a workable, L-shaped galley. The heads compartment is surprisingly roomy, with ample hanging space for wet oilskins. The aft cabin has a 6ft by 5ft double berth and the forepeak vee-berth is sealed off from the main cabin with two sliding doors."

See also
List of sailing boat types

References

Keelboats
1990s sailboat type designs
Sailing yachts
Sailboat type designs by Mortain & Mavrikios
Sailboat types built by ETAP Yachting